Unalga Island may refer to the following islands in Alaska:

 Unalga Island (Delarof Islands)
 Unalga Island (Fox Islands)